John Elmo Harris (September 12, 1952 – April 19, 2005) was an American professional wrestler and actor, who became known under his ring name Silo Sam.

Life and career

Professional wrestling
Harris played basketball before his wrestling career. In 1984, he started wrestling professionally and first appeared under the ring name "Big John Harris" in Jerry Jarrett's Memphis-based CWA.
In 1985, he worked as "Little John" for Fritz Von Erich's World Class Championship Wrestling and acted as the bodyguard for The Fantastics (Bobby Fulton and Tommy Rogers). He would guide The Fantastics to winning the tag team titles in March 1987.

In 1986, he had a short appearance for the American Wrestling Association as Silo Sam. Because of his large size, he primarily wrestled in handicap matches. He was interviewed by AWA's Ken Rensick and replied to his questions with "Yup" every time. At one point in 1987, he made an appearance in WWE as Trapper John and wrestled in a dark match, but was never used again. He remained under the WWF’s payroll for about a year, unused and never brought into television tapings. He retired from professional wrestling by 1990.

Acting

During the midst of his wrestling career, Harris played minor roles in several films. These films include Tell Me a Riddle, Blood Circus and Pee-wee's Big Adventure, as Andy, a jealous boyfriend who chased Pee Wee.

Personal life
Harris married Rayola Johnson in the mid-'80s, and divorced a few years later in Calvert County, Maryland. On April 19, 2005, Harris died at the age of 52 in Manatee County, Florida of unknown causes possibly related to gigantism.

Filmography

References

External links
Online World of Wrestling entry
Cagematch.net entry
wrestlingdata.com entry 
 

1952 births
2005 deaths
American male professional wrestlers